The List of Prequalified Vaccines, published by the World Health Organization, lists vaccines that are found to be safe, effective and of good quality, after undergoing investigation of relevant data, testing and examination of their production sites.

High priority vaccines eligible for WHO prequalification (2018-2020)

References

World Health Organization
Publications established in 1987